Oleg Sergeyevich Vlasov (born 10 December 1984) is a Russian former football player.

Career statistics

Notes

Achievements
Russian Premier League runner-up: 2003

External links
 Player page on the official FC Terek Grozny website

1984 births
People from Kirovsky District, Leningrad Oblast
Living people
Russian footballers
Russia under-21 international footballers
Association football midfielders
FC Zenit Saint Petersburg players
FC Saturn Ramenskoye players
FC Akhmat Grozny players
Russian Premier League players
FC Torpedo Moscow players
FC Mordovia Saransk players
FC Arsenal Tula players
FC Dynamo Saint Petersburg players
FC Leningradets Leningrad Oblast players
Sportspeople from Leningrad Oblast